Slaný is a town in Kladno District in the Central Bohemian Region of the Czech Republic. It has about 16,000 inhabitants. The historic town centre is well preserved and is protected by law as an urban monument zone.

Administrative parts
Villages of Blahotice, Dolín, Lotouš, Kvíc, Kvíček, Netovice, Otruby, Trpoměchy and Želevčice are administrative parts of Slaný.

Geography

The Červený Creek flows through the municipal territory from the southwest to the northeast.

History
The Wenceslaus Hajek's chronicle records Slaný as having been founded in 750, at the site of a salt spring below the Slánská hora Hill (slaný is a Czech word for "salty").

The first written mention of Slaný is from 1262. The town grew as a result of its location on the trade route between Prague and Saxony. The Benedictines established a hospital here in 1136, together with a church dedicated to St. Gotthard. It was this large presence of the church, and the unconsolidated state of landed property that went with it, that allowed King Wenceslaus II of Bohemia to charter Slaný as a town and give his royal assent to its Magdeburg rights only sometime in the decade after 1295. In 1348, an earthquake damaged the now-fortified town; in 1371, a large fire broke out, and the church had to be rebuilt.

Slaný was captured by the Taborites in 1425 during the Hussite Wars, and remained in their hands until 1434. Not only did the Benedictine monks have to leave — this town by the hill was also one of Hussite holy cities, and their preachers expected it to survive the anticipated end of the world. Later, the Hussite king George of Poděbrady gave Slaný many privileges, after the town had supported his election to the throne. The town also participated in the Bohemian Revolt that opened the Thirty Years' War, housing the family of king Frederick V of the Palatinate. After the Battle of White Mountain, that meant a defeat for the cause, the town suffered as a result of the ravages of war. Afterwards, the new Catholic possessors of Slaný, the Martinic family, erected a Baroque church and edifice that, together with a new monastery, adorn the town to this day.

Since the middle of the 19th century, Czech has been the dominant language there. Industrial development was delayed until around 1860. An important engineering factory was built in 1872 and more followed. A factory producing batteries was founded in 1918. The infrastructure and amenities of a modern town have been gradually added since the second half of the 19th century.

Demographics

Transport
Slaný is situated at the crossing of the Prague–Louny and Mělník–Karlovy Vary roads, near the end of the unfinished D7 motorway.

The town lies on the railway line from Slaný to Kralupy nad Vltavou.

Sights

The former town hall on the town square is the main landmark of the town. it is located on the site of a house, which donated King Charles IV to the town in 1378. It was burned and then rebuilt several times and its present neo-Renaissance appearance dates from 1895–1896. Today it is the seat of the police and of a gallery.

The second landmark of the town square is the former Piarist college. It was built in 1658–1665. It served students until 1939. Today it is a museum, library and cinema. The Chapel of the Espousals of the Blessed Virgin Mary is used for social events.

Velvary Gate is one of the last remnants of the town fortifications. It dates from the second half of the 15th century. Today it houses an exhibition of the town museum.

The formerly Franciscan monastery was founded in 1655 and completed in 1662. Since 1996, it has been home to the Order of Discalced Carmelites. The Church of the Holy Trinity was built in 1581–1602. The core of the church is the Loreto Chapel with a statue of the Black Mother of God, which was built in 1657.

The deanery Church of Saint Gotthard is a Gothic church located on the site of a former Romanesque basilica from the 13th century. The original Renaissance baptistery dates from 1511.

Notable people

Josef Matěj Navrátil (1798–1865), painter
Václav Beneš Třebízský (1849–1884), priest and novelist; studied here
Jan Malypetr (1873–1947), politician, prime minister of Czechoslovakia
Oskar Fischer (1876–1942), psychiatrist and neuropathologist
Olga Scheinpflugová (1902–1968), actress and author
Karel Smyczek (born 1950), film director and screenwriter
Eva Urbanová (born 1961), operatic soprano
Martin Procházka (born 1972), ice hockey player
Jiří Tlustý (born 1988), ice hockey player

Twin towns – sister cities

Slaný is twinned with:
 Pegnitz, Germany
 Skalica, Slovakia

Friendly towns
Slaný also cooperates with:
 Bolatice, Czech Republic
 Guyancourt, France
 Linlithgow, Scotland, United Kingdom

Slaný is a part of the Commonwealth of Towns With Hussite Past and Tradition, along with other 11 Czech and 6 German municipalities.

Gallery

References

Bibliography

External links

Tourist Information Centre
History of the town
Museum of Slaný 
Culture life in Slaný 
Slaný – travel guide (basic facts, history, sights, day trips)

Cities and towns in the Czech Republic
Populated places in Kladno District